Torboll Fall is a waterfall near Golspie in the Scottish Highlands.  It is also located in species-rich deciduous woodland known as the Torboll Woods Site of Special Scientific Interest.
Its grid reference number is NH744985.
A fish ladder is parallel to the waterfall to allow for the migration of fish.  The waterfall may be viewed from the bottom of the fish ladder or from a bridge that runs over the top of the waterfall.

See also 
List of waterfalls

Waterfalls of Highland (council area)